Par Siah (also Romanized as Par Sīāh and Par Seyāh; also known as Par Sīāh-e ‘Olyā) is a village in Margha Rural District, in the Central District of Izeh County, Khuzestan Province, Iran. At the 2006 census, its population was 197, in 36 families.

References 

Populated places in Izeh County